Kyle Cerminara is an American freestyle wrestler and mixed martial artist. He is a native of Lewiston, New York and attended high school at Lewiston-Porter Central School District. Cerminara attended college at the University at Buffalo and was named UB's Male Athlete of the Year twice while he was at Buffalo. In his final season there, Cerminara had a 34-3 record with a 5-0 MAC record. He was an NCAA All-American and a New York State Champion.

He is currently an assistant coach at the University of Pennsylvania and is also Head Wrestling Coach at Long Island MMA.

Mixed martial arts record 

|-
| Win
|align=center|3–0
|
|Decision (Unanimous)
|UPC Unlimited - Up & Comers 10
|
|align=center|3
|align=center|5:00
|
|
|-
| Win
|align=center|2-0
|
|Decision (Unanimous)
|LITC - Thursday Night Fights 2
|
|align=center|3 
|align=center|5:00
|
|
|-
| Win
|align=center|1-0
|
|Decision (Unanimous)
|CFFC 7 - No Mercy
|
|align=center|3
|align=center|5:00
|
|

External links
University at Buffalo info

Living people
American male sport wrestlers
Middleweight mixed martial artists
Olympic wrestlers of the United States
Sportspeople from Buffalo, New York
University at Buffalo alumni
People from Lewiston, New York
Year of birth missing (living people)